Geologichesky (masculine), Geologicheskaya (feminine), or Geologicheskoye (neuter) may refer to:
Geologichesky (settlement), a settlement in Tomsk Oblast, Russia
Geologicheskaya, a station of the Yekaterinburg Metro, Yekaterinburg, Russia